The Pakistan cricket team toured South Africa in April 2021 to play three One Day International (ODI) and four Twenty20 International (T20I) matches. The ODI series formed part of the inaugural 2020–2023 ICC Cricket World Cup Super League.

Originally, the matches were scheduled to be played in October 2020. However, in August 2020, the tour was postponed due to the COVID-19 pandemic. The following month, it was confirmed that both cricket boards were looking for a window in the international calendar to play the matches. In October 2020, Cricket South Africa (CSA) announced that the tour had been rescheduled for April 2021. In January 2021, the Pakistan Cricket Board (PCB) confirmed that the tour was still on their schedule for the 2021 calendar year. In February 2021, the tour dates were confirmed, including the addition of a fourth T20I fixture. On 4 March 2021, CSA announced that Temba Bavuma had been appointed as South Africa's limited overs captain, taking over the role from Quinton de Kock.

Pakistan won the first ODI by three wickets, with South Africa winning the second match by seventeen runs to level the series. Pakistan won the third ODI by 28 runs to win the series 2–1. In the T20I series, Pakistan won the first match by four wickets, with South Africa winning the second match by six wickets. The third match saw Pakistan win by nine wickets, with their captain Babar Azam scoring his first century in the format. Pakistan won the fourth T20I by three wickets to win the series 3–1.

Squads

Ahead of the tour, Saud Shakeel was ruled out of Pakistan's ODI squad due to an injury, with Asif Ali named as his replacement. Quinton de Kock, David Miller, Kagiso Rabada, Lungi Ngidi and Anrich Nortje were only available for the first two ODIs, before leaving South Africa's squad to play in the 2021 Indian Premier League. Pakistan's Shadab Khan injured his toe during the second ODI and was ruled out of the rest of the tour. Fakhar Zaman was named as Shadab Khan's replacement for the T20I matches.

Before the T20I series, South Africa's captain Temba Bavuma was ruled out of the squad after suffering a hamstring injury in the third ODI, with Heinrich Klaasen named as captain of the team in Bavuma's place. Dwaine Pretorius was also ruled out due to rib injury, and Reeza Hendricks opted out of the series due to personal reasons. Aiden Markram, Andile Phehlukwayo, Daryn Dupavillon and Wiaan Mulder were added to South Africa's T20I squad.

ODI series

1st ODI

2nd ODI

3rd ODI

T20I series

1st T20I

2nd T20I

3rd T20I

4th T20I

Notes

References

External links
 Series home at ESPN Cricinfo

2020 in Pakistani cricket
2020 in South African cricket
International cricket competitions in 2020–21
Pakistani cricket tours of South Africa
Cricket events postponed due to the COVID-19 pandemic